Dyenmonus trivittatus is a species of beetle in the family Cerambycidae. It was described by Per Olof Christopher Aurivillius in 1914.

Subspecies
 Dyenmonus trivittatus trivittatus Aurivillius, 1914
 Dyenmonus trivittatus wamensis Breuning, 1965

References

Saperdini
Beetles described in 1914